Marjan op den Velde (born 9 January 1971) was a Dutch water polo player. She was a member of the Netherlands women's national water polo team.

She competed with the team at the 2000 Summer Olympics. 
She was also part of the national team at the 
1991 World Aquatics Championship,
1998 World Aquatics Championships, 1999 Women's European Water Polo Championship and 1999 FINA Women's Water Polo World Cup.

See also
 List of world champions in women's water polo
 List of World Aquatics Championships medalists in water polo

References

External links
 

1971 births
Living people
Dutch female water polo players
Water polo players at the 2000 Summer Olympics
Olympic water polo players of the Netherlands
Sportspeople from Zaanstad
20th-century Dutch women
21st-century Dutch women